Jorge Herrera Caldera (born January 8, 1963) is a Mexican who has served as the Governor of Durango since September 2010. He is a member of the Institutional Revolutionary Party .  Herrera was elected Governor of Durango in 2010 with 46.4% of the vote, narrowly defeating challenger José Rosas Aispuro of the Party of the Democratic Revolution (PRD) and National Action Party (PAN), who placed second with 44.7% of the vote. He was sworn into office on September 15, 2010.

References

External links
 Legislative profile

Living people
1950 births
21st-century Mexican politicians
Members of the Chamber of Deputies (Mexico)
Governors of Durango
Politicians from Durango
People from Durango City
Universidad Juárez del Estado de Durango alumni
Academic staff of Universidad Juárez del Estado de Durango